The Men's artistic individual all-around competition at the 2014 Commonwealth Games was held on 30 July at the SSE Hydro.

England's Max Whitlock won the gold medal with a total score of 90.631 points. Scotland's Daniel Keatings won silver with 88.298 points, while Nile Wilson, also from England, won bronze with 87.965 points. Whitlock led throughout the competition to win his first major all-around gold. Of his win, Whitlock said "It feel absolutely unbelievable. I've had goosebumps all over my body the whole competition and the atmosphere has been unbelievable an the support has been great but to finish on top of the podium is an amazing feeling."

Final results

References

External links
 Results at BBC Online

Gymnastics at the 2014 Commonwealth Games